John Hoyland was a British artist.

John Hoyland may also refer to:

John Hoyland (organist) (1783–1827), English organist and composer 
John Hoyland (writer) (1750–1831), English Quaker author, known as a writer on the Romani people